Francesco Nunziatini (born 15 March 2003) is an Italian footballer who plays as a midfielder for  club San Donato, on loan from Inter Milan.

Club career
On 8 July 2021, he moved to Inter Milan and was assigned to their Under-19 squad.

On 22 July 2022, Nunziatini joined Serie C club San Donato Tavarnelle on a season-long loan.

Club statistics

Club

Notes

References

2003 births
People from Grosseto
Sportspeople from the Province of Grosseto
Footballers from Tuscany
Living people
Italian footballers
Association football midfielders
Serie B players
Serie C players
Inter Milan players
U.S. Livorno 1915 players
San Donato Tavarnelle players